Nate & Jeremiah By Design is an American reality television series on TLC. It stars Nate Berkus and Jeremiah Brent and premiered on April 8, 2017.

Premise
Nate & Jeremiah By Design follows husbands Nate Berkus and Jeremiah Brent as they help homeowners with renovation disasters, all while juggling married life and raising their  daughter, Poppy and son, Oskar. 

In each one-hour episode, Nate and Jeremiah use their extensive interior design backgrounds to assist homeowners who have gone over-budget and over-schedule on home renovation projects and cannot see an end in sight. With budget and the couple's lifestyle in mind, Nate and Jeremiah complete the renovations and transform the home's layout to build a practical and stylish space. They add character and a personal touches into each of the refreshed dwellings.

Production
Season 1 premiered on April 8, 2017. Season 2 premiered on April 7, 2018.  Season 3 was announced by Nate & Jeremiah on Instagram on January 29, 2019.

Episodes

Series overview

Season 1 (2017)

Season 2 (2018)

Season 3 (2019)

References

2010s American reality television series
2017 American television series debuts
TLC (TV network) original programming
English-language television shows